Robert Graham Hamish Robertson (born 3 October 1943) is a Canadian–American experimental physicist, specializing in neutrino physics. He is a Professor Emeritus at the University of Washington, where he was formerly the director of the University of Washington's Center for Experimental Nuclear Physics and Astrophysics.

Education and career
Robertson attended elementary and secondary school in Canada and England. He received a Bachelor of Arts from University of Oxford in 1965. In 1971, he received a Doctor of Philosophy from McMaster University, working under R. G. Summers-Gill with a dissertation titled Properties of the odd-odd cobalt nuclei.

Following his graduate work, he worked at the Cyclotron Laboratory at Michigan State University, where his research included the first observation of an isobaric quintet of states in nuclei. After leaving Michigan State, he worked at Los Alamos National Laboratory on the determination of the neutrino mass. Studying tritium decay, he showed that the electron neutrino mass is below 10 eV. In 1994, he became a professor at the University of Washington.

Robertson has been a visiting scientist at several institutions, including at Princeton University (1975–1976), Chalk River Laboratories (1979), Argonne National Laboratory (1980), and the Sudbury Neutrino Observatory (2003–2004).

He was on the editorial staff of Physical Review D and the Annual Review of Nuclear and Particle Science.

Awards and honours
 1976: Awarded a Sloan Foundation Fellowship
 1982: Elected a Fellow of the American Physical Society
 1997: Tom W. Bonner Prize in Nuclear Physics, American Physical Society
 1998: Elected a Fellow of the Institute of Physics (London)
 2003: Elected a Fellow of the American Academy of Arts and Sciences
 2004: Elected a Member of the National Academy of Sciences

See also
Helium and Lead Observatory

References

External links
Majorana | ElectroWeak Interaction Research, washington.edu

1943 births
Living people
Canadian nuclear physicists
Alumni of the University of Oxford
Michigan State University faculty
University of Washington faculty
Fellows of the American Physical Society
Fellows of the Institute of Physics
Fellows of the American Academy of Arts and Sciences
Members of the United States National Academy of Sciences